Gilbert Joseph Birnbrich was the Attorney General of the Northern Mariana Islands from 2014 to 2015.

Early life and career
Birnbrich is a native of Columbus, Ohio. He studied law in Ohio, before moving to the Northern Mariana Islands in 2003. He served as a clerk for Judge Alex Munson in the District Court for the Northern Mariana Islands from 2003 to 2006, before working in private practice for attorney Colin Thompson. In February 2010 he joined the CNMI Office of the Attorney General, becoming Chief of the Civil Division in May 2011. On December 30, 2013, he was appointed Deputy Attorney General. While at the OAG Birnbrich was a witness in the criminal trial of his former boss, ex-Attorney General Edward Buckingham, over the events culminating on Saturday, August 4, 2012.

Attorney General
When Attorney General Joey San Nicolas resigned to run for Mayor of Tinian, effective July 5, 2014, Birnbrich became the acting Attorney General. He was then appointed to the post in his own right by Governor Eloy Inos, and confirmed by the Senate in September 2014.  Birnbrich was the last Attorney General appointed by a governor before the position became an elected office, as of the 2014 elections.

References

Living people
Attorneys General of the Northern Mariana Islands
Northern Mariana Islands lawyers
Ohio State University alumni
University of Toledo College of Law alumni
Lawyers from Columbus, Ohio
1970 births